Wallace Matthew Rogerson (1880 - 1943), President of the Wallace Institute of Chicago, was an early 20th-century era exercise leader and record producer.

Rogerson was born in Moline Rock, Illinois on november 29, 1880. He made exercise records for the phonograph like “Get Thin to Music,” and presaged the work of Jack LaLanne.  Wallace Rogerson founded the Wallace Institute around the turn of the 20th century and offered in-person physical training and developed Wallace Records, or Wallace Reducing Records.  For many years he conducted the WGN programme Keep Fit to Music. A 09/06/2011 PBS "History Detectives" broadcast found that Wallace Records preceded a competitor (named Walter Camp) in marketing records for (largely women's) exercising for weight reduction. Rogerson died on February 24 in Chicago, Illinois

Rogerson's Wallace Institute is not to be confused with another Wallace Institute, which ceased operating September 1, 2002.

See also
Walter Camp

References

External links
 Google Search for Wallace M. Rogerson"
  Google Search for "Wallace Rogerson" exercise

Year of birth unknown
Year of death unknown
American exercise instructors